The Kashimbila Game Reserve is found in Taraba State, Nigeria. It was established in 1977. This site is 1396 km².

References

Game Reserves of Nigeria
Protected areas established in 1977
1977 establishments in Nigeria